was a Japanese sumo wrestler, who is formally recognised as the second yokozuna.

Ayagawa came from Tochigi prefecture and was promoted to ōzeki in 1717. According to tradition, he was the strongest wrestler in the Genbun era. He was a famous sumo wrestler in Edo, Osaka and Kyoto. The 17th Oikaze of the Yoshida family, allowed Ayagawa to be his pupil. Very little is known about his sumo career.

He died on March 14, 1765. His grave can be found in Tochigi.

It was not until over 150 years after his death that he was recognised as the 2nd yokozuna by later yokozuna Jinmaku when he was compiling a formal list for a monument.

His career predates banzuke and tournament records so no record of his rank and bouts exists.

References

See also

Glossary of sumo terms
List of past sumo wrestlers
List of yokozuna

1703 births
1765 deaths
Japanese sumo wrestlers
Sumo people from Tochigi Prefecture
Yokozuna
18th-century wrestlers